Anna Margaretha König Jerlmyr (born 9 May 1978), is a Swedish politician who served as mayor of Stockholm from 2018 to 2022. She is a member of the Moderate Party.

She was a member of the Riksdag from 2006 to 2010. Between 2010 and 2014 she was responsible for social affairs (Swedish: socialborgarråd) in Stockholm Municipality and from 2014 to 2018 as the leader of the opposition in Stockholm (Swedish: oppositionsborgarråd). She was elected mayor of Stockholm following the 2018 election.

External links 
Anna König Jerlmyr at the Riksdag website

Members of the Riksdag from the Moderate Party
Mayors of Stockholm
Living people
1978 births
Women members of the Riksdag
21st-century Swedish women politicians